Charles Stanley Blair (December 20, 1927 – April 20, 1980) was a United States district judge of the United States District Court for the District of Maryland.

Early life
Born in Kingsville, Maryland, Blair was in the United States Maritime Service from 1945 to 1947, and then received a Bachelor of Science degree from the University of Maryland, College Park in 1951 and a Bachelor of Laws from the University of Maryland School of Law in 1953.

Career
Blair was in the United States Army from 1953 to 1956, achieving the rank of captain. He was in private practice in Bel Air, Maryland from 1961 to 1969, and was a member of the Maryland House of Delegates from 1963 to 1967. He was the Maryland Secretary of State from 1967 to 1969, and was Chief of staff to the Vice President of the United States, Spiro Agnew, from 1969 to 1970. Blair ran an unsuccessful campaign for Governor of the State of Maryland in 1970. He was a Republican.

Federal judicial service

On July 14, 1971, Blair was nominated by President Richard Nixon to a new seat on the United States District Court for the District of Maryland created by 84 Stat. 294. He was confirmed by the United States Senate on July 29, 1971, and received his commission the same day. Blair served in that capacity until his death of an apparent heart attack on April 20, 1980, in Fallston, Maryland.

References

Sources
 
 Maryland gubernatorial elections

External links

1927 births
1980 deaths
Secretaries of State of Maryland
Republican Party members of the Maryland House of Delegates
Judges of the United States District Court for the District of Maryland
United States district court judges appointed by Richard Nixon
20th-century American judges
United States Army officers
People from Baltimore County, Maryland
People from Bel Air, Maryland
20th-century American lawyers
20th-century American politicians